Jean-Louis Anne Madelain Lefebvre de Cheverus (also known as John Cheverus) (28 January 1768 – 19 July 1836) was a French Roman Catholic bishop and later cardinal. He was the first Bishop of the Roman Catholic Diocese of Boston, Massachusetts in the United States, and later became a bishop and then archbishop in his native France.

Early life
Cheverus was born on January 28, 1768, in the city of Mayenne, then in the ancient Province of Maine, where his father was the general civil judge and lieutenant of police. He studied at the college of Mayenne, received the tonsure aged twelve and became the commendatory prior of Torbechet while still little more than a child, through which he derived sufficient income for his education. He entered the College of Louis le Grand in 1781, and after completing his theological studies at the Seminary of St. Magloire, was ordained a deacon in October 1790. At the age of 22, he was ordained a priest for Montauban by special dispensation on December 18. He was immediately made canon of the cathedral of Le Mans and began to act as vicar to his uncle, the pastor of Mayenne, who died in 1792, succeeding him at that time.

Cheverus refused to take the oath imposed by the Revolution and this cost him his parish, and very nearly his life. He escaped from Paris to London, in disguise. Offered aid on his arrival, he replied: "The little I have will suffice until I learn something of the language. Once acquainted with that, I can earn my living by manual labor, if necessary". In three months he was teaching French and mathematics, and within a year gathered a congregation. A letter from a former professor at Orléans, the Reverend François Antoine Matignon, now in charge under Bishop John Carroll of all the Catholic church and missions in New England, urged Cheverus to come there to help in the work of the church. Cheverus first emigrated to England in 1792, then to America, settling in Boston on October 3, 1796.

American career

Cheverus, although at first appointed to an Indian mission in Maine, remained in Boston for nearly a year, and returned there after several months in the Penobscot and Passamaquoddy missions, and visited scattered Catholic families along the way. During the epidemic of yellow fever in 1798 he won great praise and respect for his courage and charity; and his preaching was listened to by many Protestants; indeed, the subscriptions for the Church of the Holy Cross which he founded in 1803 were largely from non-Catholics.

In 1808 the papal brief was issued making Boston a bishopric, suffragan to Baltimore, and Cheverus its bishop. He was consecrated Bishop of Boston on All Saints Day 1810 in Baltimore, Maryland, by John Carroll, the first Catholic bishop of the nation. Later, upon Carroll's death, his auxiliary bishop, Leonard Neale, urged the appointment of Cheverus as auxiliary to himself. Cheverus refused and strongly asserted his desire to remain in Boston.

Cheverus supported the establishment in 1816 of the Provident Institution for Savings in the Town of Boston, the first chartered savings bank in the U.S.  He believed the bank would inspire virtuous thrifty behavior amongst his parishioners. Some of the books in Cheverus' personal library now reside in the collection of the Boston Athenaeum.

In 1820, Bishop Cheverus oversaw the opening of an Ursuline convent in the rectory of the Boston cathedral. A school for girls was set up in the convent, intended to educate the area's poor. The convent with its school later relocated to Charlestown, but was burned down in the anti-Catholic riots of 1834.

Much broken by the death of Matignon in 1818 and with his health impaired, he soon found it necessary to leave the seat of his bishopric.

Return to France

In 1823 King Louis XVIII of France insisted that Cheverus return to France. Cheverus was named the Bishop of Montauban, on January 13, 1823, while still in Boston. The parishioners of Boston asked for the appointment in France to be rescinded, even garnering 226 signatures from the adult men in the congregation. Nevertheless, Cheverus had felt called to return to France for some time. He remained in Boston before departing for the Port of New York in September 1823. He was appointed Archbishop of Bordeaux on July 30, 1826; and was elevated to cardinal on February 1, 1836, in accordance with the wish of King Louis Philippe.

On one occasion, walking outside Bordeaux, he was approached by a beggar. The Cardinal, who could never refuse an alms, gave the man a franc. 'Monseigneur", said an attendant, "I think you have made a mistake. The man you have just given money to is a Jew." "Thank you", replied the Cardinal, "It is true, I did not know it." Calling the man back, he then handed him a five franc piece, adding "There are so few who would give him anything."

Cheverus died in Bordeaux on July 19, 1836, at the age of sixty-eight.

Cheverus' work in New England, covering twenty-seven years, included every form of missionary activity. He lived among the Indians, mastering their dialect; traveled long distances on foot, attending scattered Catholics; nursed the sick and buried the dead during two yellow fever epidemics; collected funds and built a church in Boston; and served as businessman, adviser, peacemaker, servant, and pastor for his flock. His devotion to duty and extraordinary tact gradually won the respect of many Puritans. Ministers invited him to their pulpits. The legislature sought and acted on his counsel.  At a state banquet to President John Adams (whose name had headed a list of Protestant contributors to the Catholic Church building fund), he was placed next the guest of honour.

In 1950, an engraved tablet was placed adjacent to the St. Thomas More Oratory entrance at 49 Franklin Street in Boston. It reads: “Near this site stood THE CATHEDRAL OF THE HOLY CROSS, established 1803 by Jean Lefebvre de Cheverus, First Catholic Bishop of Boston; Missionary to the Penobscot Indians; Friend of President John Adams; Advisor to our State Legislature; One of America’s noblest priests. He stood by the bedside of Catholic and Protestant alike. This tablet placed by a group of Protestant Businessmen, 1950.”

Cheverus in literature

Jean-Louis Lefebvre de Cheverus, is one of the principal characters in the novel The Garden of Martyrs by Michael C. White. This is a fictional account of the historic murder in Northampton, Massachusetts, in 1805 and the subsequent conviction of James Halligan and Dominic Daley. The conviction was doubtful because of the bigotry of the period toward Catholics, and Irish Catholics in particular. Cheverus came to assist Dominic Daley, one of his parishioners in Boston, at great personal risk, in his last days and he was present at the execution in 1806.

Places named for Cheverus

Cheverus High School, a Jesuit College Preparatory school in Portland, Maine.
Cheverus Hall, a student residence at Boston College.
Collège Cheverus, a French secondary international school.
  Cheverus Centennial School, a Catholic Elementary school in Malden, Massachusetts.
College Cheverus, Public Middle school, Bordeaux, France.

References

Bibliography
 Hamon, André (1837). Vie du cardinal de Cheverus, archevèque de Bordeaux quatrième édition (Paris 1837). 
 
 "Memoir  of Bishop Cheverus," Published June 1825 in Boston Monthly Magazine, Vol. 1, Issue 2

Acknowledgments
 
 

1768 births
1836 deaths
People from Mayenne
Lycée Louis-le-Grand alumni
18th-century French Roman Catholic priests
French expatriates in the United States
French Roman Catholic missionaries
Roman Catholic bishops of Boston
Bishops of Montauban
Bishops appointed by Pope Pius VII
Archbishops of Bordeaux
19th-century French cardinals
Roman Catholic missionaries in the United States